Ashby Station may refer to:
Ashby station (BART); a BART station in Berkeley, California
Ashby station (GCRTA); a light rail station in Cleveland, Ohio
Ashby station (MARTA); a MARTA station in Atlanta, Georgia